Eupithecia aritai is a moth in the family Geometridae. It is found in Argentina.

References

Moths described in 1977
aritai
Moths of South America